Hermenegildo Galeana  (13 April 1762 – 27 June 1814) was a hero of the Mexican War of Independence, one of six brothers who fought in the insurgency. Galeana was considered the right-hand man of secular priest and leader of independence, José María Morelos and was the immediate superior of insurgent fighter Vicente Guerrero. Guerrero was of Afro-Mexican mixed-race from the west coast of Mexico where there was considerable racial mixture of the indigenous Indians, Africans and Asians brought to Mexico as slaves. Also part of the mix were non-hispanic pirates who operated on the west coast, which was a stronghold for independence. Galeana's family were landholders and "family name is said to be hispanicized from English," with the founder in Mexico being an English pirate who jumped ship, marrying a local woman.  His portrait shows him as light-complected in a region with many dark morenos. Galeana died in battle, which followed the earlier death of Morelos's lieutenant, Father Mariano Matamoros, Morelos reportedly exclaimed, "I have lost both my arms, now I am nothing."

There are several places in Mexico named Galeana after the general.

References

Further reading
Alvear Acevedo, Carlos. Galeana. Mexico: Jus 1958.

1762 births
1814 deaths
People of the Mexican War of Independence
Mexican rebels